The British music charts are compiled by the Official Charts Company to measure sales of recorded music on compact disc and digital download.

Summary
In early January, Iyaz's début single "Replay" went to number one. It became the first number one single of the 2010s; not counting Lady Gaga's "Bad Romance" which first reached number one in 2009. February saw the release of X Factor finalist Jedward's debut single, "Under Pressure (Ice Ice Baby)". Debuting at number one mid-month was the Helping Haiti single, a cover of "Everybody Hurts". The single, which was arranged by Simon Cowell, features 21 artists including Kylie Minogue, Cheryl, Leona Lewis, Robbie Williams, Mariah Carey, Rod Stewart and Susan Boyle. It recorded the biggest first-week sales of any single since 2000, selling over 453,000. All of the proceeds went to the Disasters Emergency Committee and The Sun's Helping Haiti charity.

The BRIT Awards on 16 February boosted the sales of both singles and albums; the songs performed on the BRIT Awards climbed the singles chart while the albums that won BRIT Awards climbed the albums chart. British artists received awards recognition overseas, with The Ting Tings, Adele, Seal, Imogen Heap, Pet Shop Boys and Coldplay nominated at the 52nd Grammy Awards. Also in February, the band Sade's first studio album in ten years, Soldier of Love, debuted at number one in the United States.

In March, rapper Tinie Tempah's debut single "Pass Out" entered the singles chart at number one, with sales of just over 92,000. In April, Scouting for Girls returned to the charts with their first UK number-one single "This Ain't a Love Song", the first single from their second album Everybody Wants to Be on TV. A Facebook group called Christian Music set up an Internet campaign to get Christian rock anthem "History Makers" by Delirious? to number one on Easter Sunday; it ended up getting to number four. Diana Vickers debuted at number one with "Once", and rapper Chipmunk and Dutch singer Esmée Denters secured a number-three hit with "Until You Were Gone". Tina Turner re-entered the top ten with "The Best", following an Internet campaign set up by fans of Glasgow Rangers Football Club in an attempt to get their unofficial anthem to number one.

May began with London rap collective Roll Deep releasing their first single since 2005, "Good Times", which was at number one for three weeks. Diana Vickers' debut album Songs From The Tainted Cherry Tree knocked Plan B's The Defamation of Strickland Banks off the top spot, making Vickers only the second X Factor non-winner whose debut single and album both topped their respective charts. At the end of the month, Dizzee Rascal scored his fourth number-one single with "Dirtee Disco" and Pendulum scored their first number-one album with Immersion.

June coincided with the FIFA World Cup competition, and seven World Cup-related songs entered the singles chart, including the number-one single "Shout for England" by Dizzee Rascal and James Corden, which was produced by Simon Cowell and released as a charity single. Oasis scored their seventh UK number-one album with their second compilation album, Time Flies... 1994–2009.

To begin the month of August, new British boyband The Wanted topped the UK Singles Chart with "All Time Low". The Iron Maiden album The Final Frontier was released to enormous acclaim from rock music reviewers. By September, reality television shows were starting to influence both the singles and albums charts. 2009 X Factor runner-up Olly Murs topped the singles chart with "Please Don't Let Me Go", followed by Alexandra Burke, winner of X Factor 2008, with her sixth single "Start Without You" (featuring American rapper Laza Morgan). Artists from Sky1's new reality TV show Must Be the Music achieved success during this month, including the eventual winner Emma's Imagination. Some songs used on the audition stages of  X Factor 2010 also re-entered the chart, including Adele's "Make You Feel My Love" (originally recorded by Bob Dylan).

In October, Tinie Tempah repeated his initial success by topping the singles chart with "Written in the Stars" and the album chart with debut album Disc-Overy. "Ambitions" by X Factor 2009 winner Joe McElderry reached the top ten, and his album Wide Awake the top five, although sales were below expectations. The show's judge Cheryl topped the charts with "Promise This" and Messy Little Raindrops.

During November, every number-one single had been performed live on The X Factor. Take That's much anticipated comeback with Robbie Williams started successfully; new single "The Flood" reached number two, and album Progress topped the album chart for the rest of the year. The X Factor Finalists of 2010 topped the singles chart with a cover of David Bowie's "Heroes".

The winner of that show, Matt Cardle, took the Christmas number-one of 2010, with winning single "When We Collide", a cover of the Biffy Clyro song "Many of Horror". The single sold over 700,000 copies, making it the third best-selling X Factor winning single. It also prompted the re-entry of the original version of the song by Biffy Clyro. Several internet campaigns were initiated in an unsuccessful attempt to topple X Factor following the success of the Rage Against the Machine campaign in 2009.

Number ones

Singles

Albums

Compilation albums

Year-end charts

Best-selling singles of 2010

For the first time in British music history, a song that never reached number one became the biggest-selling single of the year. "Love the Way You Lie", by Eminem featuring Rihanna, also sold all its singles in digital format.

Best-selling albums of 2010

Notes:

Best-selling compilation albums of 2010

See also 
 List of number-one singles from 2010
 List of number-one albums from 2010
 List of UK top-ten singles in 2010
 2010s in music
 List of 2010 albums
 2010 in British television

References 

 
United Kingdom
British record charts